The 1877 Victorian Football Association season was the first in which the Australian rules football competition in Victoria was run under a properly constituted administrative body. The Association was formed with the view to governing the sport via a collective body, made up of delegates representing the clubs. It was the second such body to have been formed; the South Australian National Football League having been formed just 17 days prior to the VFA.

Australian rules football had been played since the 1858, but had been administered in a less formal manner prior to the establishment of the VFA.

The inaugural VFA premiership was won by the Carlton Football Club.

Foundation of the Victorian Football Association 
The Victorian Football Association was established on 17 May 1877 to provide administration of the game in Victoria. Prior to 1877, the laws of the game had been agreed to at an annual meeting of club secretaries, however the clubs remained entirely independent and unaffiliated. This meant that when a dispute existed between two clubs, there was no formal means of resolving it or enforcing a decision. Also, the matter of whether or not Albert-park won the Challenge Cup in 1870 was never formally resolved.

The new Association was established, and was modelled in large part on the Victorian Cricket Association, which had been established in September 1875 to provide a similar level of centralised administration over Victorian cricket. The Victorian Football Association comprised one delegate from each senior metropolitan club (and from senior country clubs by proxy) and a vote of those club delegates could make a decision which was binding on any associated club. Junior clubs were also managed by the Association, but did not have representation on the board.

The Association was established with the power to:
 Decide upon the Laws of the Game
 Provide management of local and intercolonial football matches
 Provide a ruling on disputes between clubs
 Act as a tribunal to suspend players for misconduct

The Association comprised a range of senior and junior clubs from Melbourne and around the colony of Victoria. Hotham was a revival of the former North Melbourne Football Club, which had disbanded and seen many of its players and members join Albert-park in 1876; the new club was mostly made up of players from the former North Melbourne Football Club as well as some from the Carlton Imperial Football Club, which had folded at the end of 1876.

Provincial senior teams included Barwon, Ballarat, Ballarat Albion, Kyneton and Sandhurst. There was also a wide range of affiliated junior clubs, including , West Melbourne, Brunswick, Warwick, Toorak, Hotham United, Williamstown, Excelsior, Victorian Railways, Clifton, Northcote, Coburg and Sandridge.

The formation of the Association was an important step in the organization of football, but it was effectively an administrative change only. Compared with the unaffiliated 1876 season, there was no significant change to the manner in which matches were scheduled and played or the premiership decided.

1877 VFA premiership 
The 1877 premiership was won by the Carlton Football Club, which played twenty-one matches during the year, winning fourteen and drawing four.  finished second, having played twenty-three matches, winning sixteen and drawing four. At the time, Melbourne and Carlton were considered to be by far the strongest senior clubs, so Carlton's position as the top club was based almost entirely on head-to-head matches between the two clubs – of which Carlton won two, Melbourne won one, and one was drawn.

In provincial competition, Barwon was the strongest team;  was second. In the junior competition, West Melbourne was the strongest; it went undefeated against junior clubs, and its sole loss came against senior club ;  was second.

Club senior records 
The below table is set of results for the 1877 season, showing the records of the five senior metropolitan clubs. The list shows the record across all matches, including senior, junior and intercolonial matches. The clubs are listed in the order in which they were ranked in the Australasian newspaper. The VFA had no formal process by which the clubs were ranked, so the below order should be considered indicative only, particularly since the fixturing of matches was not standardised; however, the top three placings were later acknowledged in publications including the Football Record and are considered official.

Notable events 
 Sir William Clarke, MLC became the inaugural president of the Association.
 ,  and  each went on intercolonial trips during the season:
 Carlton was hosted by the Waratah club in New South Wales. On 23 June, Waratah defeated Carlton 2–0 under the rugby rules which were prevalent in New South Wales at the time, and on 25 June, Carlton defeated Waratah 6–0 under Victorian rules.
 Melbourne was hosted by the Victorians club in South Australia, where Victorian rules were played. Melbourne defeated Victorians 1–0 on 11 August, then defeated a composite South Australian team 5–0.
 St Kilda was hosted by the Adelaide club in South Australia. St Kilda defeated Adelaide 5–2 on 18 August, then defeated a composite South Australian team 7–2 on 20 August.
 The leading goalkicker for the season was Charles Baker, who kicked 12 goals.

External links 
 Victorian Football Association/Victorian Football League History (1877-2019)
 List of VFA/VFL Premiers (1877-2019)
 History of Australian rules football in Victoria (1853-1900)

References 

Victorian Football League seasons
Vfa Season, 1877